UPSU may refer to:

 University of Plymouth Students' Union
 University of Portsmouth Students' Union